The Roman Catholic  Diocese of Torreón (erected 19 June 1957) is a suffragan diocese of the Archdiocese of Durango.

The diocese was the second one created in the state of Coahuila. It comprises the five municipalities that form the Laguna region of the State: Torreón, Francisco I. Madero, Viesca, Matamoros and San Pedro. Before 1959 the territory was part of the Diocese of Saltillo.

Bishops

Ordinaries
Fernando Romo Gutiérrez (1958 - 1990)
Luis Morales Reyes (1990 - 1999), appointed Archbishop of San Luis Potosí, México
José Guadalupe Galván Galindo (2000 - 2017)
Luis Martín Barraza Beltrán, Ist. del Prado (2017 - )

Coadjutor bishop
Luis Morales Reyes (1985-1990)

Episcopal See
Torreón, Coahuila

External links and references

Torreon
Torreon, Roman Catholic Diocese of
Torreon
Torreon